Sterna is a small village in Argolis, Peloponnese, Greece. It is part of the municipal unit Lyrkeia. 

Populated places in Argolis

ar:ستيرنا، إفروس